Nationality words link to articles with information on the nation's poetry or literature (for instance, Irish or France).

Events
Matsuo Bashō completes the writing of Oku no Hosomichi ("Narrow road to the interior").

Works
 Joseph Addison, An Account of the Greatest English Poets
 Edmund Arwaker, An Epistle to Monsieur Boileau, inviting his Muse to forsake the French interest and celebrate the King of England, verse addressed to Nicolas Boileau-Despréaux, reflecting the high esteem the French poet had in England at a time when the French government was considered a dangerous enemy
 Sir Thomas Pope Blount, De Re Poetica; or, Remarks upon Poetry, with Characters and Censures of the most considerable poets, whether Ancient or Modern, Extracted out of the Best and Choicest Critics , an anthology of criticism
 John Dryden and Jacob Tonson, editors, The Annual Miscellany: for the Year 1694, the fourth in a series published by Tonson from 1684–1709; sometimes referred to as "Dryden's third Miscellany or "Tonson's third Miscellany or just "the third Miscellany; includes Dryden's translation from the original Latin of the third book of Virgil's Georgic
 Charles Gildon, editor, Chorus Poetarum; or, Poems on Several Occasions, an anthology including work by Aphra Behn, the Duke of Buckingham, Sir John Denham, Sir George Etherege and Andrew Marvell
 Charles Hopkins, Epistolary Poems

Births
Death years link to the corresponding "[year] in poetry" article:
 June 20 – Hans Adolph Brorson (died 1764), Danish Pietist bishop and hymnodist
 September 22 – Philip Stanhope, 4th Earl of Chesterfield (died 1773), English statesman and poet
 November 21 – Voltaire, born François-Marie Arouet (died 1778), French Enlightenment writer, poet, essayist and philosopher
 Approximate date – James Bramston (died 1743), English poet

Deaths
Birth years link to the corresponding "[year] in poetry" article:
 November 28 – Matsuo Bashō (born 1644), Japanese Edo period poet

See also

 List of years in poetry
 List of years in literature
 17th century in poetry
 17th century in literature
 Poetry

Notes

17th-century poetry
Poetry